Nouhou Tolo (born 23 June 1997), sometimes known mononymically as Nouhou, is a Cameroonian professional footballer who plays as a left-back for Seattle Sounders FC in Major League Soccer and the Cameroon national team. He represented Cameroon at the 2021 Africa Cup of Nations and the 2022 FIFA World Cup.

Club career
Nouhou began his career in 2015 with Rainbow Bamenda, where he played for one season. A contract dispute over who owned his rights between teams in Cameroon initially blocked his transfer to the United States, but in April 2016, Nouhou signed with Seattle Sounders FC 2. He made 24 league appearances and lead the team in minutes played.

Nouhou signed with Seattle Sounders FC on 26 January 2017, earning his first team contract after performing admirably for S2 in 2016, according to General Manager Garth Lagerway. Nouhou scored his first professional goal while loaned down to S2 on 15 April 2017, the second goal in a 2–1 away win over LA Galaxy II.

Nouhou made his Seattle Sounders FC debut on 31 May 2017, coming on as a substitute in a 3–0 loss to Columbus Crew. He quickly became a fan favorite amongst Sounders FC supporters, often known for his showmanship during matches. Nouhou was named to the 2021 MLS All-Star Game roster. He scored his first goal for the Sounders against the Houston Dynamo on 4 September 2022. He also registered an assist in the game, earning Man of the Match honors.

International career
In February 2017, Nouhou was called up to represent the Cameroon U20s in the 2017 Africa U-20 Cup of Nations in Zambia. Nouhou made his under-20 debut on 27 February 2017, starting at left back in a 3–1 loss against South Africa in the first group stage game of the tournament.

Nouhou made his debut for the Cameroon national team in a 2018 FIFA World Cup qualification 2–2 tie with Zambia on 11 November 2017.

On November 9, 2022, Nouhou was named in Cameroon's final 26-man squad for the 2022 FIFA World Cup in Qatar. He started all three matches for his country, including their historic 1-0 victory over Brazil.

Career statistics

Club

International

Honours
Seattle Sounders FC
MLS Cup: 2019
CONCACAF Champions League: 2022

Cameroon
Africa Cup of Nations bronze: 2021

Individual
MLS All-Star: 2021
CONCACAF Champions League Best XI: 2022

References

External links 
 

1997 births
Living people
Footballers from Douala
Cameroonian footballers
Association football defenders
Cameroon international footballers
Cameroon youth international footballers
2021 Africa Cup of Nations players
2022 FIFA World Cup players
Rainbow FC (Cameroon) players
USL Championship players
Major League Soccer players
Tacoma Defiance players
Seattle Sounders FC players
Cameroonian expatriate footballers
Cameroonian expatriate sportspeople in the United States
Expatriate soccer players in the United States